Michael W. Kroger (born April 24, 1951) is an American former politician. He served in the South Dakota House of Representatives from 2003 to 2006.

References

1941 births
Living people
People from Dell Rapids, South Dakota
Politicians from Salt Lake City
Businesspeople from South Dakota
Democratic Party members of the South Dakota House of Representatives